William P. Hall House is a historic home located at Lancaster, Schuyler County, Missouri. It was built about 1902, and is a large two-story, irregular plan, Late Victorian style frame dwelling.  It features a one-story wraparound porch with Ionic order columns and a porte cochere. It was the home of American showman, businessman, and circus impresario William Preston Hall (1864–1932).

It was added to the National Register of Historic Places in 1975.

References

Houses on the National Register of Historic Places in Missouri
Victorian architecture in Missouri
Houses completed in 1902
Buildings and structures in Schuyler County, Missouri
National Register of Historic Places in Schuyler County, Missouri